Taikat is a river village in Homalin Township, Hkamti District, in the Sagaing Region of northwestern Burma. Taikat lies to the northwest of Nawnghkun.

External links
Maplandia World Gazetteer

Populated places in Hkamti District
Homalin Township